Mescherin  is a municipality in the Uckermark district, in Brandenburg, in north-eastern Germany. It is located on the western shore of the Oder river and the German-Polish border.

Overview
A road bridge links Mescherin with the Polish-Pomeranian town of Gryfino across the river. Mescherin is located on the northern edge of Lower Oder Valley National Park.

On December 31, 2002, the municipalities of Neurochlitz, Radekow and Rosow were incorporated into Mescherin. In Rosow, a 13th-century church serves as a joint German-Polish memorial site for the flight and expulsion of Germans during and after World War II and the resettlement of Poles from Soviet-annexed eastern Polish territory into former eastern German provinces which became again Polish in 1945. Rosow was chosen as the Pomeranian village became a border checkpoint of both the federal highway Bundesstraße 2 and the Berlin-Szczecin railway.

Demography

References

Localities in Uckermark (district)
Germany–Poland border crossings